This is a list of Belgian football transfers for the 2019–20 winter transfer window. Only transfers involving a team from the professional divisions are listed, including the 16 teams in the 2019–20 Belgian First Division A and the 8 teams playing in the 2019–20 Belgian First Division B.

The winter transfer window opens on 1 January 2020, although a few transfers may take place before that date. The window closes at midnight on 31 January 2020 although outgoing transfers might still happen to leagues in which the window is still open. Players without a club may join teams, either during or in between transfer windows.

Sorted by date

December

End of 2019
Some players were on a loan which ended in 2019. As of 1 January 2020, they returned to their original club and are listed here. For a list of players on loan during the last year, see List of Belgian football transfers winter 2018–19 and summer 2019.

January

February

Sorted by team

Belgian First Division A teams

Anderlecht

In:

Out:

Antwerp

In:

Out:

Cercle Brugge

In:

Out:

Charleroi

In:

Out:

Club Brugge

In:

Out:

Eupen

In:

Out:

Excel Mouscron

In:

Out:

Genk

In:

Out:

Gent

In:

Out:

Kortrijk

In:

Out:

Mechelen

In:

Out:

Oostende

In:

Out:

Sint-Truiden

In:

Out:

Standard Liège

In:

Out:

Waasland-Beveren

In:

Out:

Zulte-Waregem

In:

Out:

Belgian First Division B teams

Beerschot

In:

Out:

Lokeren

In:

Out:

Lommel

In:

Out:

OH Leuven

In:

Out:

Roeselare

In:

Out:

Union SG

In:

Out:

Virton

In:

Out:

Westerlo

In:

Out:

Footnotes

References

Belgian
Transfers Winter
2019 Winter